Ashton James Hayward III (born April 15, 1969) is an American real estate developer and politician who served as the 62nd mayor of Pensacola from 2011 to 2018. He is currently the president of the Andrews Research and Education Foundation. He was the first mayor elected under the "strong mayor" form of government adopted in 2009, which shifted the mayoral duties away from a ceremonial leader to that of the city's chief executive and decision-maker.

Early life
He was born and raised in Pensacola, graduating from Pensacola Catholic High School in 1987. Hayward earned his bachelor's degree at Florida State University. While in college, he took a break from studies in Miami, where he met his future wife, Belgian-born An (married 1996). For many years, Hayward and his wife lived in New York City, returning to Pensacola in 2003 to start a real estate development firm.

Political career
In 2015, Hayward was appointed to the Florida Commission on Community Service by Governor Rick Scott. During his time in office, he also rebranded the City of Pensacola with a new slogan, "Pensacola: The Upside of Florida" which also included stronger economic development efforts.

References

External links
Archived government website
 Archived official website

1969 births
Mayors of Pensacola, Florida
Florida State University alumni
Living people
Florida Republicans
People from Escambia County, Florida
People from Pensacola, Florida